Myles Pillage (born 24 January 1998) is a British modern pentathlete.

Career
He participated at the 2018 World Modern Pentathlon Championships held in Mexico City, winning a team silver medal together with Jamie Cooke and Joe Choong. He finished 34th and the score was enough to secure a silver when combined with the 1st of Cooke and 9th of Choong.

In 2019, at the European Championships, Pillage won gold with Kerenza Bryson in the mixed relay, and another gold with Oliver Murray in the men's relay.

References

External links

Living people
1998 births
British male modern pentathletes
World Modern Pentathlon Championships medalists
Sportspeople from Plymouth, Devon